Here Come the Littles is a 1985 animated fantasy film produced in France by DIC Enterprises, Inc. and distributed by Atlantic Releasing. It was directed by Bernard Deyriès and adapted by Woody Kling from John Peterson's series of books, The Littles, and also based on the ABC television show of the same name.

Here Come the Littles follows a boy named Henry Bigg as he meets a family of miniature people that lives in his home. While his abusive uncle Augustus plans to build a shopping center at the site of his home, Henry teams up with the Littles to prevent this scheme.

Here Come the Littles was screened at weekend matinees during its original U.S. release, and made over US$6.5 million. It was not a critical success; reviewers found fault with the story and animation style. The film was released on VHS in late 1985, and on DVD in early 2004. Another Littles film, Liberty and the Littles, premiered on television in late 1986.

Plot
Henry Bigg learns that his parents have been lost during an archaeological trip to Africa, although the remains of their aircraft have been found. His housekeeper Mrs. Evans says his Uncle Augustus is his next of kin and therefore his legal guardian. Thus, Henry moves to Augustus' residence where Mrs. Evans states that she can't join him because Augustus doesn't need to have a housekeeper. While appearing friendly in the eyes of Mrs. Evans, he drops the routine when Mrs. Evans leaves and tells Henry that he will not have him shedding tears here as Augustus escorts him to his room.

Meanwhile, Tom and Lucy Little (two of the tiny people inside the walls of Henry's house) snag an apple that Mrs. Evans had left for Henry. They repay the boy by finding his lucky rabbit's foot and sneaking it in his suitcase. They are carried away to Augustus' house, trapped inside the luggage. Another two of the tiny creatures, Grandpa and Dinky, soon find them.

There, the Littles soon learn of Augustus' ill-tempered and mean-spirited ways: He treats Henry more like a slave and is planning on replacing his nephew's house with a shopping mall. While the creatures try to escape, Henry discovers Grandpa and Dinky, not knowing who—or what—they are. Augustus also sees them, but mistaking them for toys, grabs them from Henry and locks them in the desk drawer in his study. Here, Dinky and Grandpa discover that Augustus forged the documents in order to become Henry's legal guardian, as well as to steal and redevelop the Biggs' property.

To rescue those two, Lucy persuades Tom to talk to Henry—a bold move, considering that humans never knew about the creatures until recently. Grandpa and Dinky, whom Henry finds inside the study, both prove the evidence of Augustus' fraud. Before Augustus locks him inside his room, Henry soon creates a diversion allowing Tom and Lucy to save them.

Eventually, Lucy and Tom are hungry, and begin to search for food. Tom gets trapped in a jar of honey, and a change of plans ensues: the Littles must rescue Henry before they can save Tom. At first Grandpa resists, but consents since Henry has already met them.

After several attempts to escape, the Littles finally flee away aboard their gas-powered toy aircraft, but cause a garage fire that wakes up Augustus. Henry attempts to go to the police station, but gets lost and is eventually caught by his uncle. The Littles distract Augustus long enough for Henry to run down there. Meanwhile, Augustus orders the demolition crew by phone to start tearing down the Biggs' place.

When the Littles get to Henry's house, they split up. Grandpa looks for Mr. and Mrs. Little while the others try to sabotage the bulldozer. Both plans succeed just in the nick of time. The moment Augustus arrives and learns what happened, the police arrive and arrest him for propose illegal destruction to private property, forgery and the child abuse he committed on Henry.

Henry is reunited with Mrs. Evans and prepares to meet his rediscovered parents at the airport. He casts a knowing wink at the gate as the Littles watch on.

Voice cast

Crew
 Wally Burr - Recording director

Release
Along with The Smurfs and the Magic Flute and The Secret of the Sword, Here Come the Littles was among the first animated films handled by U.S. distributor Atlantic Releasing. The film was based on the ABC TV series of the same name, and produced in France by DIC Entertainment in conjunction with ABC.

Here Come the Littles was released theatrically in early 1985, and was released on the VHS format in late 1985 by CBS/Fox's Playhouse Video label, under license from ABC Video Enterprises.

The VHS was re-released by BMG Video in 1991 under the DIC Toon-Time Video label.

It was re-released on VHS and released on DVD by Sterling Entertainment on February 24, 2004. The DVD was re-issued by NCircle Entertainment on August 21, 2007.<ref>"DVD release information for 'Here Come the Littles'." Allmovie' (Rovi Corporation). Retrieved: June 13, 2019.</ref>

In 1984, Scholastic Books published a 64-page tie-in adaptation of Here Come the Littles by Lorentz Carlson and John Lawrence Peterson.

Reception
Box office
During its run in the North American market, Here Come the Littles grossed over US$6.5 million through weekend matinee showings.

Critical responseHere Come the Littles was not well-received with critics, receiving generally mixed reviews. Candice Russell of the South Florida Sun-Sentinel wrote: "[It] has all the panache of a Saturday morning cartoon and just about as much heart. It's even in the same mode of repetitive crises every third minute."

The Los Angeles Times film reviewer Charles Solomon in assessing Here Come the Littles, said: "[It] boasts an international pedigree more complicated—and interesting—than its storyline." In his Movie Guide, Leonard Maltin gave it 1½ stars out of four and called it a "silly, boring animated effort". Likewise, the Blockbuster Entertainment Guide to Videos and Movies (1999) gave it two stars, and recommended it "for fans of the Littles book series only". Jerry Beck, in his Animated Movie Guide, gave it only one star and commented: "The film raises issues of homelessness, the loss of parents, and the importance of family and friends, in a mild, one-dimensional way." Along with Russell, he criticized the "bland style" of the animation, which was outsourced in Japan.

A review in the San Francisco Chronicle stated that Here Come the Littles "is an OK, though hardly memorable, entertainment for small children. Come to think of it, pity the runts of today who get nothing but mediocre big screen fare—when they get it at all".

Sequel
A made-for-television follow-up, Liberty and the Littles, aired on the ABC network in 1986 as part of its Weekend Special anthology series. It first aired in three parts of 30 minutes, on October 18, October 25, and November 1. In the film, the Littles fly to the Statue of Liberty, and come across a group of French relatives who are under a tyrant's control.

According to one crew member, Liberty was planned for a theatrical release, but ended up on television because of a change in management during production.

References
Notes

Citations

Bibliography

 Beck, Jerry. The Animated Movie Guide. Chicago: Chicago Reader Press, 2005. .
 Blockbuster Entertainment Guide to Videos and Movies. New York: Dell Yearling, 1999. .
 Carlson, Lorentz and John Lawrence Peterson. Here Come the Littles (World of the Littles). New York: Scholastic, 1984. .
 Maltin, Leonard. Leonard Maltin's 2007 Movie Guide. New York: Signet Books, 2006. .
 Woolery, George W. Animated TV Specials: The Complete Directory to the First Twenty-Five Years, 1962-1987''. Lanham, Maryland: Scarecrow Press, 1989. .

External links

 
 
 
 

1985 films
English-language Japanese films
English-language French films
English-language Luxembourgian films
1985 anime films
1980s American animated films
1980s French animated films
1980s fantasy adventure films
American aviation films
American children's animated adventure films
American children's animated fantasy films
American fantasy adventure films
Animated films about aviation
Animated films based on children's books
Atlantic Entertainment Group films
Canadian animated fantasy films
Canadian fantasy adventure films
DIC Entertainment films
ABC Weekend Special
Animated films based on animated series
Films based on urban legends
Japanese animated fantasy films
French animated fantasy films
Luxembourgian animated films
Japanese aviation films
Japanese fantasy adventure films
Films produced by Jean Chalopin
Films scored by Shuki Levy
Films scored by Haim Saban
1980s children's animated films
Films directed by Bernard Deyriès
1980s English-language films
1980s Canadian films